I Give My Love is a 1934 American drama film directed by Karl Freund and written by Doris Anderson and Milton Krims. The film stars Paul Lukas, Wynne Gibson, Eric Linden, Anita Louise, John Darrow and Dorothy Appleby. The film was released on July 17, 1934, by Universal Pictures.

Plot

Cast 
Paul Lukas as Paul Vadja
Wynne Gibson as Judy Blair
Eric Linden as Paul Vadja Jr. - at Age 21 
Anita Louise as Lorna March
John Darrow as Alex Blair
Dorothy Appleby as Alice Henley
Tad Alexander as Paul Vadja Jr. - at Age 12 
Sam Hardy as Pogey
Kenneth Howell as Frank Howard
Louise Beavers as Woman on Street with Newspaper

References

External links 
 

1934 films
American drama films
1934 drama films
Universal Pictures films
Films directed by Karl Freund
American black-and-white films
Films produced by B. F. Zeidman
1930s English-language films
1930s American films